The 2020 Western & Southern Open was a men's and women's tennis tournament being played on outdoor hard courts from August 22–29, 2020. It was the first Masters 1000 tournament on the 2020 ATP Tour and the second WTA Premier 5 tournament on the 2020 WTA Tour. This was the first ATP tournament since the Tour was suspended due to the COVID-19 pandemic.

The 2020 tournament was the 119th men's edition and the 92nd women's edition of the Cincinnati Masters. This event normally took place in Cincinnati, Ohio, but was held at the USTA Billie Jean King National Tennis Center in New York City, United States, in order to reduce unnecessary player travel by centralizing the tournament and the subsequent US Open in the same venue.

Prize money

ATP singles main-draw entrants

Seeds

1 Rankings are as of March 16, 2020.

Other entrants
The following players received wild cards into the main singles draw:
  Andy Murray
  Tommy Paul
  Tennys Sandgren
  Frances Tiafoe

The following player used a protected ranking into the main singles draw:
  Kevin Anderson

The following players received entry from the singles qualifying draw:
  Aljaž Bedene
  Ričardas Berankis
  Salvatore Caruso
  Márton Fucsovics
  Marcos Giron
  Norbert Gombos
  Lloyd Harris
  Sebastian Korda
  Mackenzie McDonald
  Cameron Norrie
  Emil Ruusuvuori
  J. J. Wolf

Withdrawals 
 Before the tournament
  Nick Kyrgios → replaced by  Kyle Edmund
  Rafael Nadal → replaced by  Sam Querrey
  Kei Nishikori → replaced by  Lorenzo Sonego
  Guido Pella → replaced by  Alexander Bublik
  Albert Ramos Viñolas → replaced by  Richard Gasquet

ATP doubles main-draw entrants

Seeds

1 Rankings are as of August 10, 2020

Other entrants
The following pairs received wildcards into the doubles main draw:
  Steve Johnson /  Austin Krajicek
  Sebastian Korda /  Brandon Nakashima
  Tommy Paul /  Frances Tiafoe

WTA singles main-draw entrants

Seeds

1 Rankings are as of August 17, 2020.

Other entrants
The following players received wild cards into the main singles draw:
  Kim Clijsters
  Caty McNally
  Naomi Osaka
  Sloane Stephens
  Venus Williams

The following players received entry from the singles qualifying draw:
  Catherine Bellis
  Océane Dodin
  Leylah Annie Fernandez
  Kirsten Flipkens
  Anna Kalinskaya
  Ann Li
  Christina McHale
  Jessica Pegula
  Arantxa Rus
  Laura Siegemund
  Jil Teichmann
  Vera Zvonareva

The following player received entry as a lucky loser:
  Daria Kasatkina

Withdrawals 
 Before the tournament
  Belinda Bencic → replaced by  Alizé Cornet
  Kiki Bertens → replaced by  Alison Van Uytvanck
  Kim Clijsters → replaced by  Daria Kasatkina
  Fiona Ferro → replaced by  Victoria Azarenka
  Svetlana Kuznetsova → replaced by  Ajla Tomljanović
  Garbiñe Muguruza → replaced by  Bernarda Pera
  Barbora Strýcová → replaced by  Kateřina Siniaková

WTA doubles main-draw entrants

Seeds

1 Rankings are as of August 17, 2020

Other entrants
The following pairs received wildcards into the doubles main draw:
  Ann Li /  Bernarda Pera
  Jessica Pegula /  Shelby Rogers

Champions

Men's singles

  Novak Djokovic def.  Milos Raonic, 1–6, 6–3, 6–4

Women's singles

  Victoria Azarenka def.  Naomi Osaka via walkover.

Men's doubles

  Pablo Carreño Busta /  Alex de Minaur def.  Jamie Murray /  Neal Skupski, 6–2, 7–5

Women's doubles

  Květa Peschke /  Demi Schuurs def.  Nicole Melichar /  Xu Yifan, 6–1, 4–6, [10–4]

References

External links
 

2020 ATP Tour
2020 WTA Tour
 
2020
Cincinnati
2020 in American tennis
August 2020 sports events in the United States